Franklyn Farnum (born William Smith; June 5, 1878 – July 4, 1961) was an American character actor and Hollywood extra who appeared in at least 1,100 films. He was also cast in more films that won the Academy Award for Best Picture than any other performer in American film industry. He was also credited as Frank Farnum.

Life and career
Farnum was born in 1878 in Boston, Massachusetts, and became a vaudeville actor at the age of twelve. He was featured in a number of theatrical and musical productions by the time he entered silent films near the age of 40. His Broadway credits include Keep It Clean (1929), Ziegfeld 9 O'clock Frolic (1921), Ziegfeld Midnight Frolic (1921), and Somewhere Else (1913).

Farnum's career was dominated mostly by westerns. Some of his more famous films include the serial Vanishing Trails (1920) and the features The Clock (1917), The Firebrand (1922), The Drug Store Cowboy (1925), and The Gambling Fool (1925). He left films in 1925 but returned five years later at the advent of sound, only to find himself billed much further down the credits, if billed at all. However, he continued on in these obscure roles well into the 1950s.

One of his three wives was actress Alma Rubens, to whom he was briefly married in 1918. The couple divorced in 1919. He had one daughter, Martha Lillian Smith, who was born in 1898.

Farnum appeared in multiple Academy Award for Best Picture winners: The Life of Emile Zola (1937), Going My Way (1944), The Lost Weekend (1945), Gentleman's Agreement (1947), All About Eve (1950), The Greatest Show on Earth (1952), Around the World in 80 Days (1956).

On July 4, 1961, Farnum died of cancer at the Motion Picture & Television Country House and Hospital in Woodland Hills, California, at the age of 83.

Selected filmography

1910s 
 The Devil's Pay Day (1917) – Gregory Van Houten
The Man Who Took a Chance (1917) – Monty Gray
 The Clock (1917) – Jack Tempest
Bringing Home Father (1917) – Peter Drake
The Car of Chance (1917) – Arnold Baird
 The Clean-Up (1917) – Stuart Adams
The Empty Gun (1917, Short) – Robber
A Stormy Knight (1917) – John Winton
Anything Once (1917) – Teddy Crosby
 The Winged Mystery (1917) – Capt. August Sieger / Louis Siever
The Scarlet Car (1917) – Billy Winthrop
Fast Company (1918) – Lawrence Percival Van Huyler
$5,000 Reward (1918) – Dick Arlington
 The Fighting Grin (1918) – Billy Kennedy
The Empty Cab (1918) – Henry Egbert Xerxes
In Judgement Of (1918) – Dr. John O'Neill
Rough and Ready (1918) – Richard Bolton / Spike O'Brien
The Vanity Pool (1918) – Drew Garrett
Go-Get-Em Garringer (1919) – Garringer
The Virtuous Model (1919) – Edward Dorin

1920s 
Vanishing Trails (1920) – Silent Joe
The Galloping Devil (1920) – Andy Green
The Land of Jazz (1920) – Minor Role
The Fighting Stranger (1921) – Australia Joe
The Hunger of the Blood (1921) – Maslun
The Last Chance (1921) – Rance Sparr
The Struggle (1921) – Dick Storm
The Raiders (1921) – Pvt. Fitzgerald, RCMP
The White Masks (1921) – Jack Bray
So This Is Arizona (1922) – Norman Russell
Smiling Jim (1922) – Smiling Jim / Frank Harmon
When East Comes West (1922) – Jones
Texas (1922)
Trail's End (1922) – Wilder Armstrong
 Angel Citizens (1922) – Frank Bartlett
Gun Shy (1922) – James Brown
Gold Grabbers (1922)
The Firebrand (1922) – Bill Holt
Cross Roads (1922) – The Hero
Wolves of the Border (1923)
The Man Getter (1923)
It Happened Out West (1923)
Two Fisted Tenderfoot (1924)
Baffled (1924) – Dick Osborne
Crossed Trails (1924) – Tom Dawson
Western Vengeance (1924) – Jack Caldwell
Calibre 45 (1924)
Battling Brewster (1924, Serial) – Battling Jack Brewster
Courage (1924)
A Desperate Adventure (1924)
Border Intrigue (1925) – Tom Lassen
The Gambling Fool (1925) – Jack Stanford
The Drug Store Cowboy (1925) – Marmaduke Grandon
The Bandit Tamer (1925) – William Warren
Billy the Kid (1925) – Bill Bonney
The Train Wreckers (1925) – Jack Stewart
Rough Going (1925) – Himself
Two Gun Sap (1925)
Double-Barreled Justice (1925)
Pals of the West (1927)

1930s 
Beyond the Rio Grande (1930) – Joe Kemp
 Beyond the Law (1930) – Army Lieutenant
The Third Alarm (1930) – Fire Department Captain
 Dames Ahoy! (1930)
Oklahoma Jim (1931) – Army Captain
Hell's Valley (1931)
 Left Over Ladies (1931)
 Mark of the Spur (1932)
 The Reckless Rider (1932)
 Human Targets (1932)
 Frontier Days (1934)
Gold Diggers of 1935 (1935)
Fighting Caballero (1935)
Desert Mesa (1935)
 The Ghost Rider (1935)
 The Cowboy and the Bandit (1935)
What Becomes of the Children? (1936)
The Preview Murder Mystery (1936)
In Early Arizona (1938)

1940s 
Meet John Doe (1941)
Appointment in Berlin (1943)
Hail the Conquering Hero (1944)
Going My Way (1944)
The White Cliffs of Dover (1944) as Ball Guest (uncredited)
The Lost Weekend (1945) as Concert Attendee/Barfly (uncredited)
The Jolson Story (1946)
Gentleman's Agreement (1947)
Monsieur Verdoux (1947) as Victim of the stock market crash (uncredited)
Road to Rio (1947)
Angel on the Amazon (1948)
Johnny Belinda (1948)
I Remember Mama (1948)
The Fighting Kentuckian (1949)

1950s 
Destination Moon (1950)
Sunset Boulevard (1950) as Undertaker
All About Eve (1950) as Sarah Siddons Awards Guest (uncredited)
The Day the Earth Stood Still (1951)
Here Comes the Groom (1951)
The Bad and the Beautiful (1952)
Carrie (1952)
The Greatest Show on Earth (1952)
The Beast from 20,000 Fathoms (1953)
White Christmas (1954)
Black Widow (1954)
The Long, Long Trailer (1954)
No Man's Woman (1955)
East of Eden (1955) as Townsman at Carnival (uncredited)
You're Never Too Young (1955)
Around the World in 80 Days (1956) (uncredited)
Gunfight at the O.K. Corral (1957)
My Man Godfrey (1957)
King Creole (1958)
Pillow Talk (1959)
Some Like It Hot (1959) as Party Guest (uncredited)

See also

References

External links

 
 

1878 births
1961 deaths
20th-century American male actors
American male film actors
American male silent film actors
Deaths from cancer in California
Male actors from Boston
Vaudeville performers